B.V.R Subramaniyam is a retired 1988-batch Chhattisgarh cadre Indian Administrative Service (IAS) officer who was empaneled as a secretary in the central government and is experienced with conflict zone administration. He is former Principal Secretary  Finance department of the Union Territory of Jammu and Kashmir. He took over from Subarmanyam  on 20 June 2020 following the collapse of the PDP-BJP coalition government. He has previously served in the Prime Minister’s Office (PMO) under both Manmohan Singh and Narendra Modi. He has been instrumental in containing insurgency in Chhattisgarh in the 2010s. He is the current and 4th CEO of NITI Aayog.

Background 
BVR Subrahmanyam belongs to Andhra Pradesh. He is a 1987-batch IAS officer with a B.E. degree in Mechanical Engineering from Delhi Technological University in 1983. He also has a management degree from London Business School. Subrahmanyam worked in the PMO between 2004–2008 and March 2012–March 2015, serving under Prime Minister Manmohan Singh and Narendra Modi. In between his PMO stints he worked with the World Bank. In 2015 he was shifted to Chhattisgarh where he was a principal secretary followed by Additional Chief Secretary (Home). He also held additional charges of jail and transport during his tenure there. Subrahmanyam was appointed by the Appointments Committee of the Cabinet as the Chief Secretary of Jammu and Kashmir in place of B.B. Vyas on 20 June 2018 following the collapse of the PDP-BJP coalition government.

Additional Chief Secretary (Home), Chhattisgarh 
In March 2015 BVR Subrahmanyam was shifted to Chhattisgarh. Chhattisgarh chief minister Raman Singh had personally requested Prime Minister Manmohan to shift Subrahmanyam to Chhattisgarh. Initially he was a principal secretary followed by Additional Chief Secretary (Home) with additional charges of jail and transport. BVR Subrahmanyam is known for his role in conflict zone administration in the state. He pushed the coordination and cooperation between the central security forces and the state police. This, along with his on-field approach, and a change in defensive tactics to offensive strategies, has been effective in countering the Maoist insurgency in the region. He also coordinated the construction of fast tracked roads, which are considered an import factor in dealing with the Maoists.

Chief Secretary of Jammu and Kashmir 
In August 2020, BVR Subrahmanyam, while speaking to some journalists, had said that "J&K was a 'broken state' — the governance was broken badly, there was no system, no rules, and decay began a long time ago. Not a single soul had cried over detention of political and separatist leaders in August last year, when Centre scrapped J&K’s status". He drew a lot of flak for this from politicians in Kashmr, including the Jammu and Kashmir Apni Party who asked the Chief Secretary to remain "apolitical". Under Subrahmanyam, the first year of the Union Territory of Jammu and Kashmir oversaw the funding of 2,273 infrastructure projects worth Rs 5,979 crore, which had been pending for the past 5–10 years, were sanctioned and 506 completed.

References 

Indian Administrative Service officers
Living people
Advisor to Lieutenant Governor of Jammu and Kashmir
Year of birth missing (living people)
Alumni of London Business School
People from Andhra Pradesh